= TM44 inspections =

UK guidelines for air conditioning systems

TM44 inspections, or Air Conditioning Energy Assessments (ACEA), are required by law in the United Kingdom under the Energy Performance of Buildings Regulations 2007, amended in 2011 and 2012. They are designed to improve energy efficiency and reduce the carbon dioxide emissions of air conditioning systems. The name "TM44" refers to the technical memorandum TM44, which provides guidelines for these inspections.

== Purpose ==
TM44 inspections are aimed at assessing the efficiency of air conditioning systems and providing building owners and operators with advice on how to improve the efficiency, reduce the energy consumption and decrease operating costs. The inspections also look for any faults in the system and check that the system is properly maintained.

== Inspection frequency and requirements ==
Air conditioning systems with a total cooling capacity of more than 12 kW must undergo an inspection at least once every five years. This includes individual units which combined exceed 12 kW. The first inspection must occur within five years of the installation of the system. Subsequent inspections must be conducted by an accredited energy assessor within five years of the previous inspection.

The Energy Performance of Buildings Directive (EPBD) states that an inspection report should include:

- The current efficiency of the equipment
- Suggestions for improving the efficiency of the equipment
- The adequacy of equipment maintenance
- Any faults in the systems and suggested actions
- The size of the air conditioning system compared to the cooling requirements of the building

== Enforcement ==
The enforcement of the TM44 inspection is undertaken by local authorities. Failure to commission, keep or provide an updated TM44 inspection report when required by an enforcement authority could lead to a fine of £300 per unit.

There is no legal requirement for organisations to act on or implement any of the recommendations made in the report. However, organisations that are looking to make their systems more energy efficient to support them on their journey to reducing their carbon emissions, may consider making changes to the way their systems run.

== Impact ==
TM44 inspections aim to reduce the energy consumption of air conditioning units, thereby reducing their impact on the environment and cutting costs for businesses. By enforcing these inspections, the UK government encourages businesses to be more energy efficient and promotes a more sustainable approach to air conditioning.
